Megachile santacrucensis is a species of bee in the family Megachilidae. It was described by Silvana Patricia Durante, Alberto H. Abrahamovich and Mariano Lucia in 2006.

References

Santacrucensis
Insects described in 2006